Music from the Eather is the ninth studio album by Mentallo & The Fixer, released on October 26, 2012 by Alfa Matrix. The album was released as a two CD standard version and a limited edition box set containing an additional third CD, a sticker, a postcard and a poster.

Background 
The album keeps "the theme developed on the last conceptual Enlightenment Through a Chemical Catalyst album, dealing with higher or altered states of consciousness-experiences Gary Dassing has personally gone through." "I just wanted to work on music that would stimulate my ears. I wanted to do things that would trip me out!", explains Dassing. The warning on the album cover Be cautious using this substance refers to this theme. Music from the Eather completely avoids vocals. However, voice and other samples are frequently used. Several tracks are remixes or appear to be reworks of songs of the same album and of Enlightenment Through a Chemical Catalyst. The track Opening the Bandwidth for the Cosmic Signal was first released as a reworked version on the EP Commandments for the Molecular Age.

Critical reception 

Critics noted the experimental nature of Music from the Eather. Music magazine I Die: You Die wrote, "With Music From The Eather Dassing has, in a way, progressed into crafting the industrial equivalent of fusion jazz." The album's "complexity has reached an untouchable degree of perfection", wrote music magazine Side Line. Amy Nekrotique of Brutal Resonance described Music from the Eather as "absolutely exhausting to listen to". "You really have to be a fan of Mentallo And The Fixer to fully enjoy this album", concludes Side Line.

Track listing

Personnel
Adapted from the Arrange the Molecule liner notes.

Mentallo & The Fixer
 Gary Dassing (as Mentallo) – programming, arrangements, producer

Production and design
 Gary Dassing (as Mentallo) – musical assistance
 Oliver Haecker – Cover art, illustrations, design

Release history

References

External links 
 
 Music From the Eather at Bandcamp
 Music From the Eather at iTunes

2012 albums
Mentallo & The Fixer albums
Alfa Matrix albums